The Alexandra Falls (Slavey: Hatto deh Naili) is a  waterfall located on the Hay River in the Northwest Territories. The falls, the third highest in the NWT, form part of the Twin Falls Gorge Territorial Park and has its own day use area with a  trail to the main campsite at Louise Falls (15 m drop), the second of the Twin Falls.

Both Ed Lucero and Tyler Bradt, whitewater kayakers, have successfully gone over the falls in kayaks. Traditional Dene lore says that the two falls are two spirits, Grandmother and Grandfather, who protect the area.

See also
 List of waterfalls by flow rate

References

External links
 

Landforms of the Northwest Territories
Waterfalls of Canada